Gottfrid Cervantius Svensson (13 May 1889 – 19 August 1956) was a Swedish wrestler. He competed in Greco-Roman and freestyle wrestling at the 1912 and 1920 Summer Olympics and won the silver medal in the freestyle lightweight contest in 1920. Earlier in 1913 he won a silver medal at the unofficial European Championships.

References

External links
 

1889 births
1956 deaths
Olympic wrestlers of Sweden
Wrestlers at the 1912 Summer Olympics
Wrestlers at the 1920 Summer Olympics
Swedish male sport wrestlers
Olympic silver medalists for Sweden
Olympic medalists in wrestling
Medalists at the 1920 Summer Olympics
Sportspeople from Uppsala
20th-century Swedish people